Carlos Correia de Brito (deceased), is a former Portuguese footballer who played as a forward.

He joined Benfica in 1938, scoring 44 goals in 79 games, winning three major titles.

Career
Brito arrived at Benfica in 1938, at the hands of Lippo Hertzka, making his debut on q October, against Sporting. In his first year, he scored 15 goals in 25 games, with Benfica reaching the inaugural 1939 Taça de Portugal Final. The next season, he increased his goalscoring record to 18 in 34 appearances, as Benfica won the 1940 Taça de Portugal Final.

However, starting in his third season, strong competition from Valadas, Teixeira and Francisco Rodrigues saw Brito's playing time significantly cut short, as he appeared in six games in 1940–41, and none from 1941 until 1943. In his last two years he played a total of three games for Benfica, after which he departed the club with 44 goals scored in 79 games.

Honours
Benfica
 Primeira Liga: 1942–43, 1944–45
 Taça de Portugal: 1939–40
 Campeonato de Lisboa: 1939-40

References
General
 

Specific

Year of birth unknown
Year of death unknown
Portuguese footballers
Association football forwards
Primeira Liga players
S.L. Benfica footballers